Muriel Drazien (September 7, 1938 – April 14, 2018) in New York, was a psychoanalyst working first in Paris and then in Rome, a Lacanian and one of the three Tripode
that fostered the teaching of Jacques Lacan in Italy.

Biography 
Born in New York from parents of middle European Ashkenazi descent she was educated at Columbia University.
She won a Fulbright scholarship to study medicine in Paris.
There she studied psychoanalysis under the direct tuition of Jacques Lacan and went on to work with many French exponents of his discipline, including
Françoise Dolto, Maud Mannoni, Moustapha Safouan. 
She was one of the founders of École Freudienne de Paris.

Consistent with Lacan's 1973 Letter to the Italians,
in which she is nominated along with Contri and Verdiglione, she transferred to work in Rome, where she fostered Lacan's teaching.

In 1983, she founded the Psychoanalytic Association Cosa Freudiana
 to which she also acted as chairperson.

In 2002, in conjunction with the Italian Ministry of Education, Universities and she founded the Laboratorio Freudiano
 where she acted as both director and teacher.

She is remembered as a valued member of the Association Lacanienne Internationale.

Bibliography 
Mostly in French or Italian:
 Drazien, M. (2007) Couples: Coppie. Una storia psicanalitica: il nodo di Lacan, Carocci,
 Drazien, M. (2007) Nora fitted Jim like a glove: Nora calzava a Jim come un guanto. Escursione intorno al desiderio maschile e femminile, in Desiderio di uomo e desiderio di donna, Eds. M. Fiumanò, Roma, Carocci. 
 Drazien, M. (2010) Joyce the love between symptom and sinthome: Joyce. L'amour entre symptôme et sinthome, in Dante Alighieri. Les effets inattendus de l'amour de la langue, La Célibataire, 21.
 Drazien, M. (2010) The Gaze of the World: Lo sguardo del mondo L'Osservatore Romano, 18 dec 2010. version online
 Drazien, M. (2012) Love of transfert: L’amore di transfert. La formazione di un’analiste, in Le mie sere con Lacan, Editori Internazionale Riuniti, 
 Drazien, M. (2013) Joyce and l’élangues: Joyce et l’élangues, in Une journée entière avec James Joyce, La Célibataire, 27.
 Drazien, M. (2016) Lacan reader of Joyce: Lacan lettore di Joyce, Portaparole, 
 Drazien, M. (2017) The crime of Rina Forte: Le crime de Rina Forte, in Il sapere che viene dai folli, Eds: N. Dissez, C. Fanelli, Roma, Derive Approdi. .
 Drazien, M. et al. (2004) Dictionary of Psychoanalysis Dizionario di Psicanalisi, Gremese, Roma 2004. .

Note 

1938 births
French biographers
Writers from New York City
French psychoanalysts
American emigrants to France
Columbia University alumni
21st-century French women writers
21st-century biographers
Women biographers
2018 deaths
French women historians